Eugène Ménégoz (25 September 1838 – 29 October 1921) was a French Lutheran theologian who was a native of Algolsheim, Haut-Rhin.

He studied theology in Strasbourg, and in 1866 became pastor at the parish of Billettes in Paris. In 1877 he was appointed full professor to the Protestant Faculty of Theology in Paris.

With Louis Auguste Sabatier (1839–1921), he was originator of the French "Symbolo-Fideism" movement, a theological concept that was a union of symbolism and fideism. In his lectures and writings Ménégoz stressed that salvation was achieved through the act of faith independent of creed. A few of his more important publications were:
 L'autorité de Dieu, réflexions sur l'autorité en matière de foi (1892). 
 La notion biblique du miracle (1894).
 Étude sur le dogmas de la Trinité (1898). 
 Publications diverses sur le fidéisme et son application à l'enseignement chrétien traditionnel, 5 volumes (1900–21).

References 
 Musee Protestant Essay on Fideo-symbolism
  English translation

1838 births
1921 deaths
People from Haut-Rhin
19th-century Protestant theologians
20th-century Protestant theologians
French Lutheran theologians
19th-century Lutheran clergy
Academic staff of the Protestant Faculty of Theology in Paris
Burials at Père Lachaise Cemetery
19th-century French theologians
French Protestant ministers and clergy